Donatella della Porta (born 1956, in Catania) is an Italian sociologist and political scientist, who is Professor of political science and political sociology at the Scuola Normale Superiore. She is known for her research in the areas of social movements, corruption, political violence, police and policies of public order. In 2022, she was named a fellow of the American Academy of Arts and Sciences.

Biography 
della Porta is Full Professor of Sociology and Dean of the Faculty of Political and Social Sciences at the Scuola Normale Superiore. Between 2003 and 2014, she had been Full Professor in political sociology at the European University Institute. Previously, she had been Full Professor of Political Science, president of the corso di laurea in Administrative Sciences, and Director of the Department of Political Science and Sociology at the University of Florence. She has received a Diplôme d'Etudes Approfondies at the École des Hautes Études en Sciences Sociales of Paris, and a Ph.D in political and social sciences at the European University Institute in Florence.

della Porta directs COSMOS - Center on Social Movement Studies actually at the Scuola Normale Superiore, the DEMOS project (Democracy in Europe and the Mobilisation of the Society) founded by the European Commission. She also coordinated the Gruppo di Ricerca sull'azione collettiva in Europa (GRACE). 

della Porta has conducted research also at Cornell University, Ithaca College, and at the Wissenschaftszentrum Berlin für Sozialforschung. In 1990, she received a Career Development Award of the H.F. Guggenheim Foundation, and in 1997, a Stipendium of the Alexander von Humboldt Stiftung. Her main research interests concern social movements, political violence, terrorism, corruption, police and policies of public order. On these issues she has conducted investigations in Italy, France, Germany and Spain.

Publications 

 Della Porta, Donatella, Can Democracy Be Saved?: Participation, Deliberation and Social Movements, Wiley, 2013.
 Della Porta, Donatella, Social Movements in Times of Austerity, Cambridge, Polity, 2015.
 Della Porta, Donatella, Dieter Rucht (eds.), Meeting Democracy: Power and Deliberation in Global Justice Movements, New York, Cambridge, 2013.* Della Porta, Donatella, Hanspeter Kriesi and Dieter Rucht (eds.), Social Movements in a Globalizing World, New York, Macmillan, second expanded edition, 2009.
 Della Porta, Donatella (ed.), Democracy in Social Movements, Houndsmill, Palgrave, 2009.
 Della Porta, Donatella and Manuela Caiani, Social Movements and Europeanization, Oxford, Oxford University Press, 2009.
 Della Porta, Donatella (ed.) Another Europe. London, Routledge, 2009.
 Della Porta, Donatella I partiti politici, Bologna, Il Mulino, 2nd updated and expanded edition, 2009.
 Della Porta, Donatella and Gianni Piazza, Voices of the Valley, Voices of the Straits: How Protest Creates Communities, Berghahn Books, 2008
 Della Porta, Donatella and Michael Keating, eds.), Approaches and Methodologies in the Social Sciences. A Pluralist Perspective, Cambridge, Cambridge University Press, 2008.
 Della Porta, Donatella Introduzione alla scienza politica, Bologna, Il Mulino, 2008 (new expanded edition).
 Della Porta, Donatella, Maurizio Cotta and Leonardo Morlino, Scienza politica, Bologna, Il Mulino, 2008 (new expanded edition).
 Della Porta, Donatella and Gianni Piazza, Le ragioni del no. Le campagne contro la Tav in Val di Susa e il Ponte sullo Stretto, Milano, Feltrinelli, 2008.
 Della Porta, Donatella and Alberto Vannucci, Mani Impunite. Vecchia e nuova corruzione in Italia, Roma-bari, Laterza, 2007.
 Della Porta, Donatella Et al., Global democracy and the World Social Forum, Boulder Co., Paradigm, 2007.
 Della Porta, Donatella (ed.), The Global Justice Movement. Cross National and Transnational perspectives, Boulder Co. Paradigm, 2007.
 Della Porta, Donatella, O movimento por unma nova globalizacao, Sam Paulo do Brasil, Edicoes Loyola, 2007.
 Della Porta, Donatella, Abby Peterson and Herbert Reiter (eds.), The Policing of Transnational Protest, Aldershot, Ashgate, 2006.
 Della Porta, Donatella La Politica locale, Bologna, Il Mulino, 2006, third revised edition.
 Della Porta, Donatella, Massimiliano Andretta, Lorenzo Mosca and Herbert Reiter, Globalization from Below, Minneapolis, The University of Minnesota Press, 2006.
 Della Porta, Donatella and Olivier Fillieule (eds.), Police et manifestants, Paris, Presses de Science Po., 2006.
 Della Porta, Donatella Manuela Caiani, Quale Europa? Europeizzazione, identità e conflitti, Bologna, Il Mulino, 2006
 Della Porta, Donatella and Mario Diani, Social Movements: an introduction, 2nd edition, Oxford, Blackwell, 2006
 Della Porta, Donatella and Sidney Tarrow (eds), Transnational Protest and Global Activism, New York, Rowman and Littlefield, 2005
 Della Porta, Donatella (ed.), Comitati di cittadini e democrazia urbana, Cosenza, Rubbettino, 2004.
 Della Porta, Donatella and Herbert Reiter, La protesta e il controllo. Movimenti e forze dell’ordine nell’era della globalizzazione, Milano, Berti/Altreconomia, 2004.
 Della Porta, Donatella and Maurizio Cotta and Leonardo Morlino, Fondamenti di scienza politica, Bologna, Il Mulino, 2004.
 Della Porta, Donatella and Mario Diani, Movimenti senza protesta? L’ambientalismo in Italia, Bologna, Il Mulino, 2004.
 D. della Porta and H. Reiter, Polizia e protesta, Bologna, Il Mulino, 2003.
 D. della Porta, I new global, Bologna, Il Mulino, 2003
 M. Andretta, D. della Porta, L. Mosca and H. Reiter, Global, noglobal, new global. Le proteste contro il G8 a Genova, Roma, Laterza, 2002 (also in German by Campus Verlag)
 D. della Porta and S. Rose-Ackerman (eds.), Corrupt exchanges, Baden-Baden, Nomos Verlag, 2002
 D. Della Porta, Introduzione alla scienza politica, Bologna, Il Mulino, 2002.
 D. Della Porta, I partiti politici, Bologna, Il Mulino, 2001.
 M. Cotta, D. della Porta, L. Morlino, Scienza politica, Bologna, Il Mulino, 2001.
 D. della Porta, M. Greco, A. Szakolczai (eds.), Identità, riconoscimento, scambio. Saggi in onore di Alessandro Pizzorno, Roma-Bari, Laterza, 2000.
 D. della Porta, A. Vannucci, Un paese anormale, Roma-Bari, Laterza, 1999.
 D. della Porta, H. Kriesi and D. Rucht (eds.), Social Movement in a Globalizing World, New York, Macmillan, 1999.
 D. della Porta, M. Diani, Social Movements: An Introduction, Oxford, Basil Blackwell, 1999.
 D. della Porta, A. Vannucci, Corrup Exchanges, Aldine de Gruyter, 1999.
 D. della Porta, La politica locale, Bologna, Il Mulino, 1999.
 D. della Porta and H. Reiter (eds.), Policing Protest. The Control of Mass Demonstration in Western Democracies, Minneapolis, The University of Minnesota Press.
 D. della Porta e M. Diani, I movimenti sociali, Roma, Nuova Italia Scientifica, 1997.
 D. della Porta, Movimenti collettivi e sistema politico in Italia, Roma-Bari, Laterza, 1996.
 D. della Porta, Social Movements, Political Violence and the State, Cambridge, Cambridge University Press, 1995 (Honorable Mention for the Distinguished Scholarship Award of the Collective Behavior and Social Movements Section of the American Sociological Association in 1996).
 D. della Porta, Y. Meny (eds.), Démocratie et corruption en Europe, Paris, La Découverte, 1995 (published also in Italian by Liguori, in Portuguese by Inquerito, and in English by Pinter).
 D. della Porta, A. Vannucci, Amministrazione pubblica e corruzione. Risorse, meccanismi, attori, Bologna, Il Mulino 1994.
 D. della Porta, Lo scambio occulto. Casi di corruzione politica in Italia, Bologna, Il Mulino, 1992.

References

External links 
 Donatella della Porta Personal page
 Homepage at European University Institute
 European University Institute
 DEMOS Project Democracy in Europe and the Mobilisation of the Society
 Project Executive Summary Edited by Donatella Della Porta and Herbert Reiter Florence, February 2008
 European Political Science Review
 "Global-net for Global Movements? A Network of Networks for a Movement of Movements". By Donatella Della Porta and Lorenzo Mosca. Journal of Public Policy, 25, I, 165-190, Cambridge University Press, 2005.

Living people
Italian sociologists
Italian women sociologists
Italian political scientists
Academic staff of the European University Institute
Academic staff of the Scuola Normale Superiore di Pisa
Women political scientists
1956 births